Operation Galaxia was the codename given to the plan which preceded the 23-F attempted coup d'état in Spain. It was named Galaxia, because the officers who took part met in Cafetería Galaxia in Madrid (later known as Van Gogh Café, and as of 2019 is a Taco Bell), on  11 November 1978.

It was meant to take place on 17 November 1978, to stop the Spanish transition to democracy taking place at that time. That date was chosen because the King, Juan Carlos, would be away in South America. The three people in charge of the operation were Guardia Civil Lieutenant-Colonel Antonio Tejero, Major Ricardo Saenz Ynestrillas, and another colonel, whose name has not been revealed. 

An Infantry Captain of the Police, and an Infantry Commander of the Army were present at the conversation, and informed their superiors of the plot.

On 8 May 1980, the two main suspects, Tejero and Ynestrillas, were court-martialled, and on their way, they were cheered by crowds with nationalist flags, but also insulted, which showed the division of Spain at that time. The attorney general asked for six years for Tejero, and five for Ynestrillas, but they were only given seven months and a day and six months and a day respectively, the minimum sentence. Neither of them lost their military rank, and Ynestrillas was later promoted to Commander (major).

1981 attempt 

Lieutenant-Colonel Tejero attempted another coup on 23 February 1981, in the middle of the voting by the deputies for the new Prime minister. He took over the Cabinet and lower house of Parliament with 200 men, holding 350 deputies hostage and announcing the constitution of a military junta. This became known as the 23-F coup.

References
 

Attempted coups in Spain
1978 in Spain
20th century in Spain
1970s coups d'état and coup attempts